Jardim Ângela is a district in the subprefecture of M'Boi Mirim of the city of São Paulo, Brazil.

References

Districts of São Paulo